David Allan Aardsma (born December 27, 1981) is an American former professional baseball pitcher, currently serving in the Toronto Blue Jays front office as a coordinator of player development. He played in Major League Baseball (MLB) from 2004 to 2015 for the San Francisco Giants, Chicago Cubs, Chicago White Sox, Boston Red Sox, Seattle Mariners, New York Yankees, New York Mets, and Atlanta Braves.

Amateur career
Aardsma was born in Denver, Colorado, and attended Cherry Creek High School in Colorado, graduating in 2000. He subsequently attended Pennsylvania State University in his first year of college. He transferred to Rice University in 2001, where he remained for the rest of his college tenure. Playing for the Rice Owls baseball team, Aardsma set school single-season and career records in saves in 2003. In the 2003 College World Series, he earned two wins and a save as the Owls won their first national championship.

In 2002, while playing collegiate summer baseball for the Falmouth Commodores in the Cape Cod Baseball League (CCBL), Aardsma was named a league all-star, posting a 0.68 ERA with 45 strikeouts over 26.2 innings. In 2010, he was inducted into the CCBL Hall of Fame.

Professional career

San Francisco Giants
The right-hander was drafted in the 1st round (22nd overall) of the 2003 Major League Baseball Draft by the San Francisco Giants. He went to the San Jose Giants (Single-A), where he posted a 1.96 ERA while striking out 28 in about 18 innings. He made the major-league roster in 2004, skipping Double-A and Triple-A, and made his debut in the season's second game. In his major league debut, in front of friends and family at Minute Maid Park, he pitched two innings, allowing three hits and walking one, to earn his first MLB win. In his first six appearances, he had a 1.80 ERA; unfortunately his success did not last as his ERA ballooned to 6.75 after 11 appearances. After giving up two runs in one inning on April 20, he was sent down to Fresno, the Giants Triple-A team, the next day. He was called up six more times throughout the season.

Aardsma's route through professional baseball has been somewhat unusual, given that after making the leap from Single-A to the Giants, he was demoted to Triple-A and then subsequently started the 2005 season in Double-A with the Norwich Navigators.

Chicago Cubs
Along with pitcher Jerome Williams, Aardsma was traded to the Chicago Cubs for veteran pitcher LaTroy Hawkins on May 28, 2005. He spent the season in the minor leagues before returning to the big leagues with the Cubs in 2006, posting a 3–0 record and 4.08 ERA in 45 relief appearances, finishing nine games. Aardsma was especially effective against left-handed hitters, holding them to a .190 (12-for-63) batting average against.

Chicago White Sox
After a solid 2006 season with the Cubs, Aardsma, along with minor leaguer Carlos Vásquez, was sent across town to the Chicago White Sox in exchange for reliever Neal Cotts. Aardsma started the 2007 season strong. In April, he posted a 1.72 ERA while recording 23 strikeouts in only 15.2 innings pitched; he struck out at least one batter in each of his first 13 appearances of the season. On April 4, Aardsma matched a career high with five strikeouts against the Cleveland Indians. On April 11, as the White Sox visited the Oakland Athletics, he recorded his first American League win. In May, however, troubles mounted and Aardsma finished the month with a season ERA to that point of 4.73 and an ERA of 9.00 for the month.

Following June 2, Aardsma was optioned to Triple-A Charlotte. He was recalled on June 19, but continued to struggle in his last appearances with the team. Overall, he ended with a 6.40 ERA in 25 games.

Boston Red Sox
On January 28, 2008, the Boston Red Sox acquired Aardsma from the White Sox for pitching prospects Willy Mota and Miguel Socolovich.

He pitched in 47 games for the team that year, going 4–2 with a 5.55 ERA. He also spent two games in the minors, posting a 0.00 ERA for the Triple-A Pawtucket Red Sox.

, Aardsma appears first alphabetically on the all-time list of Major League players.

Seattle Mariners
Less than a year after joining the Red Sox, Aardsma was traded to the Seattle Mariners on January 20, 2009, for minor league pitcher Fabian Williamson. On April 10, he recorded the first save of his career, pitching 2 innings of relief against the Oakland Athletics.

The Mariners gave Aardsma a chance to close a game behind Brandon Morrow. Afterward, he became the team's official closer.

Aardsma was a projected pick for the All-Star Game, but failed to make both the starting and the reserve roster. He followed an outstanding 2009 season with an excellent 2010. Converting 31 of 35 save opportunities, he finished the year 19-for-20 in saves with a 1.80 ERA from June 13 to September 19.

After having Tommy John surgery in July 2011, Aardsma was not offered arbitration by the Mariners and became a free agent after the season.

New York Yankees
On February 22, 2012, Aardsma signed a contract with the New York Yankees worth one year and $500,000 with a club option for 2013. The General Manager was quoted as saying, "The move could help us in 2012, but it has a lot more eyes toward 2013." Aardsma was activated from the disabled list on September 25, 2012, after Steve Pearce and Justin Thomas were designated for assignment. He pitched in just one game for the Yankees, on September 27, and allowed one run in one inning.

On October 29, the Yankees elected to exercise Aardsma's incentive-laden $500,000 club option for 2013. However, they designated him for assignment before the start of the 2013 season. When no other team claimed him off waivers, he was released.

Miami Marlins/New York Mets
Desiring the best opportunity for playing time, Aardsma signed with the Miami Marlins, and was assigned to their Class AAA team. He opted out of his contract on May 15, 2013, after pitching in ten games for the New Orleans Zephyrs.

On May 20, 2013, Aardsma signed a minor league deal with the New York Mets. After pitching in eight games for the Triple-A Las Vegas 51s, he was promoted to the Mets on June 8, 2013. He appeared in 43 games for the Mets with a 4.31 ERA and a 2–2 record.

Cleveland Indians/St. Louis Cardinals
Aardsma signed a minor league deal with the Cleveland Indians on January 23, 2014. He was released on March 21, 2014, after not making the team in spring training.

Aardsma promptly signed another minor league deal, this time with the St. Louis Cardinals on March 26, 2014. He played in 35 games in the Cardinals farm system, mostly with the AAA Memphis Redbirds and was 4–1 with a 1.46 ERA and 11 saves.

Los Angeles Dodgers
Aardsma signed a minor league contract with the Los Angeles Dodgers on February 15, 2015, and was invited to spring training. He did not make the Dodgers opening day roster, and was instead assigned to the AAA Oklahoma City Dodgers. In 20 games with Oklahoma City, he had a 2.41 ERA and 18 saves. He opted out of his contract on June 4 and became a free agent.

Atlanta Braves
On June 6, 2015, Aardsma signed a minor league contract with the Atlanta Braves. He was added to the Major League roster on June 9. He was designated for assignment on August 24 after compiling a 4.99 ERA in 33 games for the Braves. He was released on September 1 and never pitched again in the major leagues.

Toronto Blue Jays
On February 5, 2016, Aardsma signed a minor league contract with an invitation to spring training with the Toronto Blue Jays. He was assigned to minor league camp on March 25. On May 23, Aardsma opted out of his contract.

Long Island Ducks
On April 3, 2017, Aardsma signed with the Long Island Ducks of the Atlantic League of Professional Baseball.

Retirement
Aardsma announced his retirement on February 5, 2018, and joined the Blue Jays front office as a coordinator of player development.

Personal life
Aardsma is of Dutch descent, with all of his great-great-grandparents coming from the Netherlands. Because of this, he was slated to play for the Netherlands in the World Baseball Classic, but was ruled ineligible and did not play. Of all baseball players in history, the surname 'Aardsma' ranks first alphabetically; his major league debut displaced Hall of Famer Hank Aaron. Aardsma's sister is American actress and beauty pageant contestant Amanda Aardsma.

Aardsma and his wife Andrea have a son, born on June 26, 2010.

References

External links

1981 births
Living people
American people of Dutch descent
Baseball players from Denver
Chicago Cubs players
Chicago White Sox players
Major League Baseball pitchers
San Francisco Giants players
Boston Red Sox players
Seattle Mariners players
New York Yankees players
New York Mets players
Atlanta Braves players
Rice Owls baseball players
San Jose Giants players
Grand Canyon Rafters players
Fresno Grizzlies players
West Tennessee Diamond Jaxx players
Mesa Solar Sox players
Norwich Navigators players
Iowa Cubs players
Charlotte Knights players
Pawtucket Red Sox players
Tacoma Rainiers players
Gulf Coast Yankees players
Tampa Yankees players
Staten Island Yankees players
New Orleans Zephyrs players
Las Vegas 51s players
Gulf Coast Cardinals players
Memphis Redbirds players
Oklahoma City Dodgers players
Gwinnett Braves players
Buffalo Bisons (minor league) players
Long Island Ducks players
Falmouth Commodores players
Penn State Nittany Lions baseball players